The Mansfield Natural Gas Field is located west of Mansfield, Ohio, within the Appalachian foreland basin. The field is 1.5 miles long by 1.4 miles wide and is in a general oval shape, stretching northward. This field, although small, is an analog for many of the natural gas fields that occur within the Appalachian Basin.  It was first discovered by the Pan American Petroleum and Transport Company (now BP) in the early 1930s. It is part of the Utica – Lower Paleozoic system, which is estimated to make up 15 to 20 percent of the total hydrocarbon abundance of the Appalachian Basin.

A majority of the exploration of the Utica – Lower Paleozoic system occurred during the late 1990s into the early 2000s. The explorations efforts were focused on natural gas accumulations in hydrothermal and fractured dolomite in New York, Ohio, West Virginia, and Pennsylvania.

Hydrocarbons were first discovered in the late 1880s in much of central Ohio. Since 2002 the amount produced and the remaining reserves comprise 15 to 20 percent of the total discovered oil and gas reserves within the Appalachian basin. Much of the hydrocarbons have been discovered on the east-dipping western flank of the Appalachian basin in both Ohio, northwestern Pennsylvania, and western New York. The average depths of reservoirs associated with the Utica shale range from 6,000 to 12,000 feet in depth.

Source rock 
The source rock for the Mansfield Natural Gas Field is the Utica Shale.

Lithology 
The primary source rock is the Utica Shale. The Utica shale is a black shale that dates to the Late Ordovician age. The distribution of this unit is regionally extensive throughout the entire Appalachian basin. Thickness of the Utica Shale in central Ohio is 180 to 230 ft. and thickens moving east towards Pennsylvania and New York to be 320 – 350 feet and 350 – 700 feet respectively. The Utica shale unit has little variation over the extent of the Appalachia basin.

Organic content 
The Utica shale ranges from 2 to 3 percent by weight within the region. The primary organic continent is Type II kerogen, which is typically associated with oil generation. Based on the Conodont color alteration index it has been found that much of the Utica Shale unit is Mature.

Reservoirs 

The reservoir rocks for the Mansfield Natural Gas Field are stratigraphically below the Utica Shale source rock and consist of dolomite, sandstones, limestones, and minor shale units.

Upper Cambrian Cooper Ridge Dolomite, Upper Cambrian Rose Run Sandstone, and Lower Ordovician Beekmantown Dolomite 
Upper Cambrian Cooper Ridge Dolomite, Upper Cambrian Rose Run Sandstone, and Lower Ordovician Beekmantown Dolomite compose the lowest reservoir units. The secondary vuggy porosity of the two dolomitic units are a result of extensive leaching during subaerial exposure of stromatolites. The intercrystalline porosity with in the dolomite units is attributed to hydrothermal dissolution. Within the Sun Rose sandstone unit, the primary porosity is attributed to the oversized pores and the occurrence of enlarged intergranular pores. The latter is interpreted as a secondary dissolution process. Both the dolomite units and the sandstone unit have a high presence of fractures that aid in the flow of hydrocarbons.

Black River and Trenton Limestones 
Black River and Trenton Limestones are composed of carbonate mudstone, wackestones, and fossiliferous limestones. This unit is the result of a reef complex, which has a high porosity. The major gas and oil reservoir in the Black River and Trenton Limestones are located in northern Ohio and the Southern Tier of New York. This is composed of a medium to coarse grained dolomite, that is highly altered due to the ascending fluids altering the limestone to dolomite. The dolomite is concentrated to sub-vertical fault zones associated with the Proterozoic basement.  However, the dominant porosity throughout the Black River and Trenton Limestone in the Mansfield Natural Gas Field is controlled by the fractures. Porosity values in the dolomitized Black River and Trenton reservoirs range from 5 to 16 percent.

Clinton sandstone, Medina sandstone, and Tuscarora Sandstone 
Clinton sandstone, Medina sandstone, and Tuscarora Sandstone reservoirs are compositionally mature quartz arenites, sublithicarenites, and subarkoses sandstones that are very fine to fine grained. The cement composition ranges from silica rich to calcite rich. Total thickness of the reservoir unit ranges from 100 to 700 feet over the entire basin. Porosity within this unit ranges from 3 to 15 percent, which is due to the varying degrees of diagenesis of feldspars and the silica cement.

Queenston Shale 
Queenston Shale is composed of shale with minor amounts of siltstone and sandstones throughout the reservoir unit. The upper portion of the unit is composed of a sandstone that is classified as a fine-grained quartz arenite. The porosity values of this unit are 3 to 4 percent. There is little to no diageneses in this unit.

Lockport Dolomite 
Lockport Dolomite is the primary reservoir rock for the Mansfield Natural Gas Field. The Lockport Dolomite is a microcrystalline dolomite that varies in thickness from 5 to 40 feet, and is linked to bioherm buildups. Porosity in the Lockport Dolomite is highly influenced on the vuggy and molic nature of the dolomite itself. The porosity values range from 3.4 percent in the microcrystalline dolomite to 9.6 percent in the vuggy dolomite.

Utica Shale 

The Utica Shale is a thinly laminated black shale that is high in organic content, and is the primary source rock in the Mansfield Natural Gas Field. The Utica shale is a relatively thin unit ranging from 50 to 90 feet in thickness and when acting as a reservoir it is self-sourced and highly fractured. Due to the presence of the fractures, it then induces porosity in the unit. However the porosity is relatively low at 1.4 percent. The analog for this is the Utica Shale reservoirs in Quebec.

Hydrocarbon Traps 
Traps range from stratigraphic traps formed as pinchouts, Carbonate bioherms, Diagenetic-facies traps and unconformities. While the primary structural traps are low-amplitude anticlines, structural terraces, faulted anticlines, and faults. Traps are typically a combination of the aforementioned mechanisms. The major type observed throughout the Appalachian basin is pinchouts that are transposed against low amplitude anticlinal structures. A minor trapping mechanism is caused by the high mobile water saturation present in certain regions.

Seals 
Seals for the Utica – Lower Paleozoic system are the sequences of evaporates that compose the Upper Silurian Salina Group. This group is composed of halite, anhydrite, anhydrite dolomite mudstone. However, there are numerous secondary seal rocks throughout the system that include the following: Upper Ordovician Utica Shale, Reedsville Shale, Queenston Shale and Juniata Formation, and the Lower Silurian Rochester Shale and Rose Hill Formation. These secondary seals are only on the local scale due to the presence of fractures and faults allowing the hydrocarbons to escape to other reservoirs.

See also
Petroleum industry in Ohio

References 

Mansfield, Ohio
Natural gas fields in the United States